This article compares browser engines, especially actively-developed ones.

Some of these engines have shared origins. For example, the WebKit engine was created by forking the KHTML engine in 2001. Then, in 2013, a modified version of WebKit was officially forked as the Blink engine.

General information
The following browser engines are discussed in this article

Support
These tables summarize what actively-developed engines can support.

Operating systems
The operating systems that engines can run on without emulation.

Notes

Image formats

Media formats

Typography

Other items

See also
Comparison of web browsers
Comparison of email clients

Notes

References

Layout engines
engine